The 2014 Russian Cup was held in Penza, Russia from 27-31 August 2014.

Medal winners

Result

Senior Team Final

All-Around Result

Vault Final

Uneven Bars Final

Balance Beam Final

Floor Exercise Final

World Championships team selections 
The team to the 2014 World Artistic Gymnastics Championships was announced on 31 August 2014.

External links
https://web.archive.org/web/20140903060401/http://sportgymrus.ru/contest/21868/21943/default.aspx

Cup of Russia in artistic gymnastics
2014 in gymnastics
Russian Cup